Chetwynd is a ghost town in Lake County, Florida just north of Fruitland Park, Florida. It was settled in 1883 by a group of British land company run by Granville Bryan Chetwynd-Stapylton. The majority of settlers were Enlgish bachelors, sons of landed gentry, who came to make their fortune by growing and selling citrus. The Great Freeze resulted in the town being abandoned by many settlers. All that remains of the town is the Holy Trinity Episcopal Church in Fruitland Park founded in 1886.

References

External links 

 Chetwynd on Ghosttowns.com
 Chetwynd Chronicles Website

Geography of Lake County, Florida
Ghost towns in Florida